Ingemar Andersson (1 June 1928 - 17 July 1992) was a Swedish sprint canoeist who competed in the late 1940s and early 1950s. Competing in two Summer Olympics, he earned his best finish of fourth in the C-1 1000 m event at London in 1948.

References
Sports-reference.com profile

1928 births
1992 deaths
Canoeists at the 1948 Summer Olympics
Canoeists at the 1952 Summer Olympics
Olympic canoeists of Sweden
Swedish male canoeists